The Best Of Me is a 2007 compilation album by Yolanda Adams.

Track listings

 Victory 4:42
 I Gotta Believe 3:39
 Yeah 3:17
 Open My Heart 5:40
 This Too Shall Pass 4:58
 Fragile Heart 4:38
 Be Blessed 5:44
 Continual Praise 4:28
 Never Give Up 5:16
 I Believe I Can Fly (duet with Gerald Levert) 5:59
 In the Midst of It All 6:56
 Someone’s Watching Over You 4:51

Chart positions

References

Yolanda Adams albums
2007 greatest hits albums